= Ancient Dome =

Italian metal band

Ancient Dome is an Italian thrash metal band. They have released five albums, all through Punishment 18 Records.

== Discography ==
- Human Key (2009) – redone as Human Key 2.0 (2025)
- Perception of This World (2010)
- Cosmic Gateway to Infinity (2014)
- O.W.T. ...and Still We Are (2015)
- The Void Unending (2017)
